Cladonia portentosa, also known as reindeer lichen or the cream cup lichen, is a light-coloured, fruticose, cup lichen in the family Cladoniaceae.

A similar-looking species, also known by the common name "reindeer lichen", is Cladonia rangiferina.

Description
Cladonia portentosa forms compact interwoven mats up to 6 cm tall. It is richly branched, each branch usually dividing into three but with the penultimate sometimes dividing into two.  The branching is at a larger angle than that of Cladonia rangiferina.

Conservation status
As of July 2021, its conservation status has not been estimated by the IUCN. In Iceland, its conservation status is denoted as data deficient (DD).

See also
List of Cladonia species

Illustrations
Gilbert, O. 2004.

References

portentosa
Lichen species
Lichens described in 1865